Bhagwan Sharma also known as Guddu Pandit is an Indian politician and a member of the 15th and 16th Legislative Assembly of India. He represents the Debai constituency of Uttar Pradesh and was a member of the Samajwadi Party political party until 2017.

Early life and education
Bhagwan Sharma was born in Gautam Budh Nagar district. He attended the Patel Higher Secondary School and is educated till tenth grade.

Political career
Shribhagwan Sharma has been a MLA for two terms. He represented the Debai constituency and is a member of the Samajwadi Party political party. During the 15th Vidhan Sabha, he was a member of the Bahujan Samaj Party. Sharma was expelled from the SP along with his brother Mukesh Sharma for defying the party whip by cross-voting in favor of a Bharatiya Janata Party nominee and attempted to contest with the BJP, but were denied tickets, after which, they joined the Rashtriya Lok Dal.

Posts held

See also
 Debai (Assembly constituency)
 Sixteenth Legislative Assembly of Uttar Pradesh
 Uttar Pradesh Legislative Assembly

References

Samajwadi Party politicians
Uttar Pradesh MLAs 2007–2012
Uttar Pradesh MLAs 2012–2017
People from Gautam Buddh Nagar district
1974 births
Living people